Jatukham Rammathep is the name of a popular amulet sold by some Buddhist temples in Thailand. The amulet is named for two princes of the Srivijaya kingdom of southern Thailand, and is believed to provide protection and good fortune to the bearer.  Some legends hold that the name actually belongs to an incarnation of the Bodhisattva Avalokitesvara, whose worship was known in the south due to the presence of Mahayana Buddhism there during earlier eras.

The original Jatukam Rammathep amulets were created in 1987 by a retired Thai police general who believed that the spirit of Jatukham Rammathep had assisted him in solving a difficult murder case.

During 2006, Jatukam Rammathep amulets began to grow wildly in popularity among Thais who believed in their ability to grant good fortune and solve personal problems.  The amulets were initially distributed by a temple in the town of Nakhon Si Thammarat in southern Thailand.  As the demand for these amulets grew, they began to also be produced at other temples in Thailand.

In April 2007, a woman died after being trampled in a rush to acquire reservations for a batch of Jatukam Rammathep amulets being produced at the Mahathat Woromaha Vihan temple in Nakhon Si Thammarat. Later that month, in the face of a crime wave of daily amulet robberies, Thailand's Supreme Patriarch stopped providing materials from the temple, such as ash from incense, used to make the amulets.

Trucks with loudspeakers blare promotions for different series of amulets all day in Nakhon Si Thammarat, and colorful posters cover many walls.

It is estimated that sales of the Jatukham Rammathep amulet in Thailand will amount to over 20 billion baht during 2007.

References

External links
 History of Jatukam Ramathep amulets
 The Jatukham Rammathep Amulet Obsession – includes an image of a Jatukham Rammathep amulet
 Patriarch ends role in amulets
 AmuletForums – Thai Amulets and Buddhism Online Discussion Forums

Thai culture
Buddhism in Thailand
Buddhist artifacts
Thai folklore